Vester Richard "Tennessee" Wright  (January 21, 1921 - July 24, 1966) was an American Champion Thoroughbred horse racing trainer who led all trainers in the United States in wins four times.

Born in Gallatin, Tennessee, he was widely known as  "Tennessee Wright."  His major race wins included the 1953 Florida Derby with Money Broker,  the 1956 Louisiana Derby with Reaping Right. His best runner was probably Roman Line who won the 1961 Breeders' Futurity then in 1962 the Forerunner and Derby Trial Stakes before finishing second in the Kentucky Derby and third in the Preakness Stakes.

On July 24, 1966, Tennessee Wright's promising career was cut short  when he suffered a heart attack and died at age forty-five. In 1991, he was inducted posthumously into the Fair Grounds Racing Hall of Fame.

References
 December 19, 1954 Los Angeles Times article on Tennessee Wright titled "Talented Trainer"
 Jul 26, 1959 Chicago Daily Tribune article on Tennessee Wright titled "He Has A Way With Horses"

1921 births
1966 deaths
People from Gallatin, Tennessee
American horse trainers